This article is about the results and history of Leicester Tigers in cup finals. Leicester Tigers are a prominent rugby union club in England and compete in major national and continental finals. Leicester have competed in 46 major finals winning 28 and losing 18.

Summary

Midland Counties Cup

RFU Knock-out Cup

Launched in 1971 the Cup was the first nationwide competition for rugby union clubs in England. It was a straight knock-out cup format, teams were not seeded however with the introduction of leagues the top division side such as Leicester joined the competition in later rounds, and ran until 2005 when it was replaced by the Anglo-Welsh Cup. Tigers played in 10 finals, winning 5.

Anglo-Welsh Cup

Launched in 2005 to replace the knock-out cup the Anglo-Welsh Cup is played with a group stage consisting of the 12 Premiership Rugby clubs and the 4 Welsh regions from the Pro12 then a knock out round between the group winners. Tigers have played in 4 finals, winning 3.

Premiership Final

Zurich Championship

A precursor to the Premiership playoffs it was contested as a stand-alone tournament in 2001 and 2002.

Premiership Final

Since 2003 the Champion of Premiership Rugby has been decided by a playoff system between the top sides after the 22 games regular season. Tigers have played in 10 finals, winning 5.

European Cup Final

Launched in 1995 English sides joined the competition in the 1996-97 season. Known for sponsorship reasons as the Heineken Cup from 1995–2013 Tigers have reached 5 European Cup Finals, winning 2.

European Challenge Cup final
The European Rugby Challenge Cup is the second level of European competition, for those clubs who did not qualify for he main European Cup or in some years were knocked out in the group stages of the main competition. Leicester have reached one final, losing it to Montpellier.

Other Finals

Zurich Wildcard

Played three times this was a mid-table playoff for a place in the following season's Heineken Cup.

Orange Cup

The Orange Cup, named for sponsors Orange S.A., was played between the winners of the Premiership and Top 16, as it then was, as a pre-season trophy in the style of a Charity Shield.

Sources and references
 

Leicester Tigers
Sport in Leicester